The Garden is a 2017 German drama film directed by Sonja Kröner. It was screened in the Discovery section at the 2017 Toronto International Film Festival.

Cast
 Katja Brenner as Brigitte Schauer
 Jonathan Bähr as Frank
 Peter Clös as Flachs
 Günther Maria Halmer as Erich
 Grischa Huber as Frau Fischer
 Mavie Hörbiger as Gitti
 Thomas Loibl as Bernd

References

External links
 

2017 films
2017 drama films
2010s German-language films
German drama films
2010s German films